The 2008–09 Sporting de Gijón season was the first season that the club played in La Liga, the highest tier of football in Spain, eleven years after its last time.

In the previous season, the club promoted as third qualified of Segunda División.

Overview
Sporting established a new record in La Liga of consecutive games without draws. It earned its first draw in the matchday 34 against Athletic Bilbao, but it lost a possible win in the 92nd minute.

The club avoided relegation after winning its last three season games against Málaga, at Real Valladolid and Recreativo de Huelva, all of them by 2–1 scorelines.

In the Copa del Rey, Sporting was eliminated in quarter-finals by Athletic Bilbao. The club had not reached this round since 1995.

Squad

From the youth squad

Competitions

La Liga

Results by round

League table

Matches

Copa del Rey

Matches

Squad statistics

Appearances and goals

|-
|colspan="14"|Players who appeared for Sporting no longer at the club:

|}

References

External links
Profile at BDFutbol
Official website

Sporting de Gijón seasons
Sporting de Gijón